The list of ship launches in 1992 includes a chronological list of all ships launched in 1992.


References 

1992
Ship launches